The 2015–16 New York Knicks season was the 70th season of the franchise in the National Basketball Association (NBA).

The season is notable when Kristaps Porzingis gained national attention when he was booed after being drafted fourth overall in the 2015 NBA Draft.

Derek Fisher in just his second season as Knicks head coach was fired on February 8, 2016 and assistant coach Kurt Rambis took over for the rest of the season.

Draft

With their sole selection in the 2015 NBA Draft, the New York Knicks selected the originally labelled 7'1" (later revealed to actually be 7'3") power forward/center from Latvia named Kristaps Porziņģis. At the time of his selection, the crowd supporting the team had greeted him with boos and jeers against him, with Stephen A. Smith originally expressing doubts and concerns with this selection. However, months after his selection, Porziņģis became an immediate star player for the Knicks, growing a huge crowd of support for himself the further the season went on, with even Stephen A. Smith changing his original stance on his later on in the season. Porziņģis would end the season with winning each Eastern Conference Rookie of the Month Award, as well as earning easy support for an NBA All-Rookie First Team spot. He was also considered the runner-up for the NBA Rookie of the Year Award, falling just short of that draft year's #1 pick, Karl-Anthony Towns.

Roster

Preseason game log

|- style="background:#bfb;"
| 1 
| October 7
| Bauru
| 100–81
| Carmelo Anthony (17)
| Galloway, O'Quinn (8)
| Grant, O'Quinn (4)
| Madison Square Garden19,037
| 1–0
|- style="background:#bfb;"
| 2 
| October 9
| @ Washington
| 115–104
| Carmelo Anthony (21)
| O'Quinn, Porzingis (10)
| Jose Calderón (7)
| Verizon Center14,267
| 2–0
|- style="background:#bfb;"
| 3 
| October 12
| Philadelphia
| 94–88
| Derrick Williams (21)
| Lou Amundson (9)
| Jerian Grant (6)
| Madison Square Garden19,255
| 3–0
|- style="background:#bfb;"
| 4 
| October 16
| Boston
| 101–95
| Derrick Williams (19)
| Kyle O'Quinn (11)
| Calderón, Galloway (5)
| Madison Square Garden19,421
| 4–0
|- style="background:#fbb;"
| 5 
| October 17
| @ Charlotte
| 93–97
| Cleanthony Early (17)
| Derrick Williams (5)
| Galloway, Thomas (6)
| Time Warner Cable Arena11,632
| 4–1
|- style="background:#fbb;"
| 6 
| October 22
| @ Boston
| 85–99
| José Calderón (17)
| Kyle O'Quinn (11)
| Kristaps Porziņģis (4)
| TD Garden16,101
| 4–2

Standing

Regular season game log

|- style="background:#bfb;"
| 1
| October 28
| @ Milwaukee
| 
| Derrick Williams (24)
| Kyle O'Quinn (11)
| Anthony, Grant (5)
| BMO Harris Bradley Center18,717
| 1–0
|-style="background:#fbb;"
| 2
| October 29
| Atlanta
|  
| Carmelo Anthony (25)
| Kyle O'Quinn (10)
| Jerian Grant (7)
| Madison Square Garden19,812
| 1–1
|-style="background:#bfb;"
| 3
| October 31
| @ Washington
| 
| Carmelo Anthony (37)
| Robin Lopez (8)
| Anthony, Galloway, Vujačić (4)
| Verizon Center20,356
| 2–1

|- style="background:#fbb;"
| 4
| November 2
| San Antonio
| 
| Carmelo Anthony (19)
| Kristaps Porziņģis (14)
| Robin Lopez (4)
| Madison Square Garden19,812
| 2–2
|- style="background:#fbb;"
| 5
| November 4
| @ Cleveland
| 
| Carmelo Anthony (17)
| Carmelo Anthony (12)
| José Calderón (5)
| Quicken Loans Arena20,562
| 2–3
|- style="background:#fbb;"
| 6
| November 6
| Milwaukee
| 
| Carmelo Anthony (17)
| Kristaps Porziņģis (12)
| Carmelo Anthony (6)
| Madison Square Garden19,812
| 2–4
|- style="background:#bfb;"
| 7
| November 8
| L.A. Lakers
| 
| Carmelo Anthony (24)
| Robin Lopez (13)
| Jerian Grant (8)
| Madison Square Garden19,812 
| 3–4
|- style="background:#bfb;"
| 8
| November 10
| @ Toronto
| 
| Carmelo Anthony (23)
| Robin Lopez (8)
| Galloway, Grant (4)
| Air Canada Centre19,800
| 4–4
|- style="background:#fbb;"
| 9
| November 11
| @ Charlotte
| 
| Carmelo Anthony (29)
| Kristaps Porziņģis (15)
| Calderón, Grant (5)
| Time Warner Cable Arena16,643
| 4–5
|- style="background:#fbb;"
| 10
| November 13
| Cleveland
| 
| Carmelo Anthony (26)
| Williams, Porziņģis (7)
| Anthony, Afflalo (4)
| Madison Square Garden19,812
| 4–6
|- style="background:#bfb;"
| 11
| November 15
| New Orleans
| 
| Carmelo Anthony (29)
| Carmelo Anthony (13)
| Anthony, Calderón, Grant, Lopez (3)
| Madison Square Garden19,812
| 5–6
|- style="background:#bfb;"
| 12
| November 17
| Charlotte
| 
| Kristaps Porziņģis (29)
| Anthony, Porziņģis (11)
| Anthony, Grant (5)
| Madison Square Garden19,812
| 6–6
|- style="background:#bfb;"
| 13
| November 20
| @ Oklahoma City
| 
| Carmelo Anthony (25)
| Robin Lopez (7)
| José Calderón (7)
| Chesapeake Energy Arena18,203 
| 7–6
|- style="background:#bfb;"
| 14
| November 21
| @ Houston
| 
| Kristaps Porzingis (24)
| Kristaps Porzingis (14)
| José Calderón (7)
| Toyota Center18,226
| 8–6
|- style="background:#fbb;"
| 15
| November 23
| @ Miami
| 
| Carmelo Anthony (21)
| Kristaps Porzingis (14)
| Carmelo Anthony (4)
| American Airlines Arena19,777 
| 8–7
|- style="background:#fbb;"
| 16
| November 25
| @ Orlando
| 
| Carmelo Anthony (25)
| Carmelo Anthony (13)
| José Calderón (4)
| Amway Center18,846
| 8–8
|- style="background:#fbb;"
| 17
| November 27
| Miami
| 
| Anthony, Porzingis (11)
| Quinn, Porzingis (8)
| Jerian Grant (6)
| Madison Square Garden19,812
| 8–9
|- style="background:#fbb;"
| 18
| November 29
| Houston
| 
| Arron Afflalo (31)
| Kristaps Porzingis (13)
| Afflalo, Calderón, Galloway, Seraphin (4)
| Madison Square Garden19,812
| 8–10

|- style="background:#bfb;"
| 19
| December 2
| Philadelphia
| 
| Kristaps Porzingis (17)
| Kristaps Porzingis (10)
| José Calderón (5)
| Madison Square Garden19,812
| 9–10
|- style="background:#bfb;"
| 20
| December 4
| Brooklyn
| 
| Carmelo Anthony (28)
| Kristaps Porzingis (10)
| José Calderón (10)
| Madison Square Garden19,812
| 10–10
|- style="background:#fbb;"
| 21
| December 5
| @ Milwaukee
| 
| Carmelo Anthony (18)
| Kristaps Porzingis (7)
| Calderón, Seraphin (5)
| BMO Harris Bradley Center16,223
| 10–11
|- style="background:#fbb;"
| 22
| December 7
| Dallas
| 
| Kristaps Porzingis (28)
| José Calderón (7)
| Carmelo Anthony (8)
| Madison Square Garden19,812
| 10–12
|- style="background:#fbb;"
| 23
| December 9
| @ Utah
| 
| Carmelo Anthony (13)
| Kyle O'Quinn (6)
| Sasha Vujacic (7)
| Vivint Smart Home Arena18,586
| 10–13
|- style="background:#fbb;"
| 24
| December 10
| @ Sacramento
| 
| Carmelo Anthony (23)
| Carmelo Anthony (14)
| Carmelo Anthony (4)
| Sleep Train Arena17,317
| 10–14
|- style="background:#bfb;"
| 25
| December 12
| @ Portland
| 
| Carmelo Anthony (37)
| Lopez, Quinn (7)
| Derrick Williams (4)
| Moda Center19,511
| 11–14
|- style="background:#bfb;"
| 26 
| December 16 
| Minnesota 
| 
| Arron Afflalo (29)
| Carmelo Anthony (15)
| Carmelo Anthony (9)
| Madison Square Garden19,812 
| 12–14
|- style="background:#bfb;"
| 27
| December 18
| @ Philadelphia
| 
| Arron Afflalo (22)
| Afflalo, Quinn (7)
| José Calderón (6)
| Wells Fargo Center17,880
| 13–14
|- style="background:#bfb;"
| 28 
| December 19
| Chicago 
| 
| Carmelo Anthony (27)
| Kyle O'Quinn (10)
| José Calderón (5)
| Madison Square Garden19,812
| 14–14
|- style="background:#fbb;"
| 29
| December 21
| Orlando 
| 
| Carmelo Anthony (23)
| Lopez, Porzingis (8)
| Carmelo Anthony (6)
| Madison Square Garden19,812
| 14–15
|- style="background:#fbb;"
| 30
| December 23
| @ Cleveland
| 
| Kristaps Porzingis (23)
| Kristaps Porzingis (13)
| José Calderón (6)
| Quicken Loans Arena20,562
| 14–16
|- style="background:#fbb;"
| 31
| December 26
| @ Atlanta
| 
| Carmelo Anthony (18)
| Carmelo Anthony (12)
| José Calderón (8)
| Philips Arena19,015
| 14–17
|- style="background:#fbb;"
| 32
| December 27
| @ Boston
| 
| Carmelo Anthony (29)
| Kristaps Porzingis (12)
| Langston Galloway (5)
| TD Garden18,624
| 14–18
|- style="background:#bfb;"
| 33
| December 29
| Detroit
| 
| Carmelo Anthony (24)
| Robin Lopez (7)
| José Calderón (8)
| Madison Square Garden19,812
| 15–18

|- style="background:#fbb;"
| 34 
| January 1
| @ Chicago
| 
| Carmelo Anthony (20)
| Kristaps Porzingis (9)
| José Calderón (4)
| United Center22,443
| 15–19
|-style="background:#bfb;"
| 35
| January 3
| Atlanta
| 
| Arron Afflalo (38)
| Robin Lopez (11)
| Jerian Grant (7)
| Madison Square Garden19,812
| 16–19
|-style="background:#bfb;"
| 36
| January 5
| @ Atlanta
| 
| Afflalo, Anthony (23)
| Anthony, Porzingis (11)
| José Calderón (6)
| Philips Arena15,082
| 17–19
|-style="background:#bfb;"
| 37
| January 6
| @ Miami
| 
| Anthony (25)
| Derrick Williams (8)
| Carmelo Anthony (4)
| American Airlines Arena19,987
| 18–19
|-style="background:#fbb;"
| 38
| January 8
| @ San Antonio
| 
| Kristaps Porzingis (28)
| Carmelo Anthony (12)
| José Calderón (5)
| AT&T Center18,420
| 18–20
|-style="background:#bfb;"
| 39
| January 10
|  Milwaukee
| 
| Carmelo Anthony (24)
| Carmelo Anthony (10)
| Carmelo Anthony (8)
| Madison Square Garden19,812
| 19–20
|-style="background:#bfb;"
| 40
| January 12
| Boston
| 
| Kristaps Porzingis (26)
| Derrick Williams (10)
| Jerian Grant (8)
| Madison Square Garden19,812
| 20–20
|-style="background:#fbb;"
| 41
| January 13
| @ Brooklyn
| 
| Arron Afflalo (18)
| Robin Lopez (12)
| Langston Galloway (5)
| Barclays Center17,732
| 20–21
|- style="background:#fbb;"
| 42
| January 16
| @ Memphis
| 
| Kristaps Porzingis (17)
| Langston Galloway (11)
| Calderón, Galloway (5)
| FedEx Forum18,119
| 20–22
|- style="background:#bfb;"
| 43
| January 18
| Philadelphia
| 
| Arron Afflalo (25)
| Kristaps Porzingis (12)
| Carmelo Anthony (7)
| Madison Square Garden19,812
| 21–22
|- style="background:#bfb;"
| 44
| January 20
| Utah
| 
| Carmelo Anthony (30)
| Robin Lopez (12)
| Carmelo Anthony (9)
| Madison Square Garden19,812
| 22–22
|- style="background:#fbb;"
| 45
| January 22
| L. A. Clippers
| 
| Carmelo Anthony (16)
| Kristaps Porzingis (8)
| Jerian Grant (8)
| Madison Square Garden19,812
| 22–23
|-style="background:#fbb;"
| 46
| January 23
| @ Charlotte
| 
| Derrick Williams (19)
| Derrick Williams (14)
| José Calderón (7)
| Time Warner Cable Arena17,768
| 22–24
|- style="background:#fbb;"
| 47
| January 26
| Oklahoma City
| 
| Langston Galloway (21)
| Derrick Williams (10)
| José Calderón (6) 
| Madison Square Garden19,812
| 22–25
|- style="background:#fbb;"
| 48
| January 28
| @ Toronto
| 
| Arron Afflalo (20)
| Robin Lopez (8)
| Jerian Grant (6)
| Air Canada Centre19,800
| 22–26
|- style="background:#bfb;"
| 49
| January 29
| Phoenix
| 
| Carmelo Anthony (19)
| Carmelo Anthony (10)
| Carmelo Anthony (8)
| Madison Square Garden19,812
| 23–26
|- style="background:#fbb;"
| 50
| January 31
| Golden State
| 
| Carmelo Anthony (24)
| Carmelo Anthony (10)
| Langston Galloway (5)
| Madison Square Garden19,812
| 23–27

|- style="background:#fbb;"
| 51
| February 2
| Boston
| 
| Arron Afflalo (18)
| Carmelo Anthony (14)
| Carmelo Anthony (4)
| Madison Square Garden19,812
| 23–28
|- style="background:#fbb;"
| 52
| February 4
| @ Detroit
| 
| Robin Lopez (26)
| Robin Lopez (16)
| Carmelo Anthony (8)
| Palace of Auburn Hills17,095
| 23–29
|- style="background:#fbb;"
| 53
| February 5
| Memphis
| 
| José Calderón (18)
| Lopez, Porzingis (10)
| José Calderón (5)
| Madison Square Garden19,812
| 23–30
|- style="background:#fbb;"
| 54
| February 7
| Denver
| 
| Anthony, Porzingis (21)
| Kristaps Porzingis (13)
| Carmelo Anthony (7)
| Madison Square Garden19,812
| 23–31
|- style="background:#fbb;"
| 55
| February 9
| Washington
| 
| Carmelo Anthony (33)
| Carmelo Anthony (13)
| José Calderón (6)
| Madison Square Garden19,812
| 23–32
|- align="center"
|colspan="9" bgcolor="#bbcaff"|All-Star Break
|- style="background:#fbb;"
| 56
| February 19
| @ Brooklyn
| 
| Carmelo Anthony (22)
| Kristaps Porzingis (8)
| Carmelo Anthony (6)
| Barclays Center17,732
| 23–33
|- style="background:#bfb;"
| 57
| February 20
| @ Minnesota
| 
| Carmelo Anthony (30)
| Robin Lopez (16)
| Carmelo Anthony (4)
| Target Center16,663
| 24–33
|- style="background:#fbb;"
| 58
| February 22
| Toronto
| 
| Carmelo Anthony (23)
| Robin Lopez (13)
| Carmelo Anthony (5) 
| Madison Square Garden19,812
| 24–34
|- style="background:#fbb;"
| 59
| February 24
| @ Indiana
| 
| Kristaps Porzingis (22)
| Anthony, Lopez (7)
| Calderón, Galloway, Thomas (4)
| Bankers Life Fieldhouse16,018
| 24–35
|- style="background:#bfb;"
| 60
| February 26
| Orlando
| 
| Carmelo Anthony (19)
| Arron Afflalo (12)
| Carmelo Anthony (6)
| Madison Square Garden19,812
| 25–35
|- style="background:#fbb;"
| 61
| February 28
| Miami
| 
| Carmelo Anthony (25)
| Robin Lopez (14)
| Anthony, Galloway (4)
| Madison Square Garden19,812
| 25–36

|- style="background:#fbb;"
| 62
| March 1
| Portland
| 
| Carmelo Anthony (23)
| Carmelo Anthony (10)
| Carmelo Anthony (4)
| Madison Square Garden19,812
| 25–37
|- style="background:#fbb;"
| 63
| March 4
| @ Boston
| 
| Carmelo Anthony (30)
| Robin Lopez (12)
| José Calderón (5)
| TD Garden18,624
| 25–38
|- style="background:#bfb;"
| 64
| March 5
| Detroit
| 
| Carmelo Anthony (24)
| Carmelo Anthony (10)
| Carmelo Anthony (6)
| Madison Square Garden19,812
| 26–38
|- style="background:#fbb;"
| 65
| March 8
| @ Denver
| 
| Carmelo Anthony (30)
| Grant, Porzingis (7)
| Anthony, Calderón (4)
| Pepsi Center13,305
| 26–39
|- style="background:#bfb;"
| 66
| March 9
| @ Phoenix
| 
| Anthony, Vujacic (23)
| Robin Lopez (8)
| José Calderón (12)
| Talking Stick Resort Arena17,105
| 27–39
|- style="background:#fbb;"
| 67
| March 11
| @ L. A. Clippers
| 
| Kristaps Porzingis (23)
| Robin Lopez (19)
| José Calderón (7) 
| STAPLES Center19,175
| 27–40
|- style="background:#bfb;"
| 68
| March 13
| @ L. A. Lakers
| 
| Carmelo Anthony (26)
| Carmelo Anthony (12)
| José Calderón (6)
| STAPLES Center18,997
| 28–40
|- style="background:#fbb;"
| 69
| March 16
| @ Golden State
| 
| Carmelo Anthony (18)
| Kristaps Porziņģis (7)
| Carmelo Anthony (6)
| Oracle Arena19,596
| 28–41
|- style="background:#fbb;"
| 70
| March 19
| @ Washington
| 
| Anthony, Porziņģis (30)
| Kevin Seraphin (9)
| Carmelo Anthony (5)
| Verizon Center20,356
| 28–42
|- style="background:#fbb;"
| 71
| March 20
| Sacramento
| 
| Robin Lopez (23)
| Robin Lopez (20)
| José Calderón (4)
| Madison Square Garden19,812
| 28–43
|-style="background:#bfb;"
| 72
| March 23
| @ Chicago
| 
| Kristaps Porziņģis (29)
| Robin Lopez (13)
| José Calderón (8)
| United Center21,788
| 29–43
|-style="background:#bfb;"
| 73
| March 24
| Chicago
| 
| Carmelo Anthony (26)
| Kristaps Porziņģis (10)
| José Calderón (7)
| Madison Square Garden19,812
| 30–43
|- style="background:#fbb;"
| 74
| March 26
| Cleveland
| 
| Carmelo Anthony (28)
| Carmelo Anthony (9)
| José Calderón (7)
| Madison Square Garden19,812
| 30–44
|- style="background:#fbb;"
| 75
| March 28
| @ New Orleans
| 
| Carmelo Anthony (22)
| Kristaps Porziņģis (10)
| Carmelo Anthony (6)
| Smoothie King Center17,000
| 30–45
|- style="background:#fbb;"
| 76
| March 30
| @ Dallas
| 
| Carmelo Anthony (31)
| Robin Lopez (9)
| Langston Galloway (3)
| American Airlines Center20,435
| 30–46

|- style="background:#bfb;"
| 77
| April 1
| Brooklyn
| 
| Langston Galloway (18)
| Kevin Seraphin (7)
| Langston Galloway (7)
| Madison Square Garden19,812
| 31–46
|- style="background:#fbb;"
| 78
| April 3
| Indiana
| 
| Sasha Vujacic (21)
| Robin Lopez (15)
| Langston Galloway (6)
| Madison Square Garden19,812
| 31–47
|- style="background:#fbb;"
| 79
| April 6
| Charlotte
| 
| Derrick Williams (17)
| Derrick Williams (10)
| Carmelo Anthony (7)
| Madison Square Garden19,812
| 31–48
|- style="background:#bfb;"
| 80
| April 8
| @ Philadelphia
| 
| Robin Lopez (24)
| Robin Lopez (15)
| Jerian Grant (6)
| Wells Fargo Center16,076
| 32–48
|- style="background:#fbb;"
| 81
| April 10
| Toronto
| 
| Carmelo Anthony (21)
| Kyle O'Quinn (10)
| Langston Galloway (4)
| Madison Square Garden19,812
| 32–49
|- style="background:#fbb;"
| 82
| April 12
| @ Indiana
| 
| Derrick Williams (21)
| Kyle O'Quinn (7)
| Sasha Vujacic (6)
| Bankers Life Fieldhouse17,906
| 32–50

Transactions

Trades

Free agents

Re-signed

Additions

Subtractions

References

New York Knicks seasons
New York Knicks
New York Knicks
New York Knicks
2010s in Manhattan
Madison Square Garden